The Indoor Football League (IFL) began in 1999 as an offshoot of the troubled Professional Indoor Football League. Keary Ecklund, the owner of the Green Bay Bombers and Madison Mad Dogs, left the PIFL after its first, financially troubled, season to start his own league. Unlike the PIFL, the IFL was an "entity league"; teams were owned by the league and franchised out to management groups. NFL Hall-of-Famer Kellen Winslow was brought in as commissioner. The league was successful enough for a major expansion in 2000. Expansion was done regionally to cut down on travel expenses. Hence, the majority of the teams were in the Midwest.  Their championship game was known as the Gold Cup.

Midway through the 2000 season, the Topeka Knights changed management and nicknames and became the Kings. After the season, the entire league was purchased by the Arena Football League's Orlando Predators. Two teams, the Lincoln Lightning and Peoria Pirates, as well as many players, became a part of their developmental ("farm") league, the AF2. The Wichita Warlords were rebranded the Wichita Stealth. Other teams resurfaced with new names in the Indoor Professional Football League (which consisted of the remnants of the PIFL that Ecklund left in 1999) and the National Indoor Football League.

1999 teams

North Division

1. y-Peoria Pirates, 11-1

2. x-Green Bay Bombers, 9-3

3. Madison Mad Dogs, 6-6

4. Duluth-Superior Lumberjacks, 1-11

South Division

1. y-Lincoln Lightning, 7-5

2. x-Dayton Skyhawks, 6-6

3. Topeka Knights, 6-6

4. Steel Valley Smash, 2-10

y – clinched division
x – clinched wild card

1999 Playoffs

2000 teams

Eastern Conference

Northern Division
1. z-Peoria Pirates (14-0)

2. x-Green Bay Bombers (10-4)

3. x-Madison Mad Dogs (8-6)

4. Minnesota Purple Rage (5-9)

5. Duluth-Superior Lumberjacks (2-12)

6. La Crosse River Rats (2-12)

Southern Division
1. y-Steel Valley Smash (9-5)

2. x-Erie Invaders (6-8)

3. x-Dayton Skyhawks (6-8)

4. Johnstown Jackals (3-11)

5. Flint Flames (2-12)

Western Conference

Northern Division
1. z-Bismarck Blaze (11-3)

2. x-Black Hills Machine (10-4)

3. x-Casper Cavalry (9-5)

4. Billings Thunderbolts (8-6)

5. Fargo Freeze (1-13)

Southern Division
1. y-Topeka Knights/Kings (10-4)

2. x-Lincoln Lightning (10-4)

3. x-Sioux City Attack (9-5)

4. Sioux Falls Cobras (8-6)

5. Wichita Warlords (4-10)

z – clinched conference
y – clinched division
x – clinched wild card

2000 Playoffs

Failed Franchises/Expansion
Iowa Voltage - announced as member of, but never actually played, in the league.

References

Defunct indoor American football leagues in the United States
Sports leagues established in 1999
Sports leagues disestablished in 2000
1999 establishments in the United States
2000 disestablishments in the United States